Mariemont, also Morlanwelz-Mariemont, is a former royal estate and hunting park in Belgium, created in the 16th century by Mary of Hungary, from whom it took its name. It was reconstructed several times through the centuries before being finally destroyed in 1794.

The royal residences formerly on the site have long since been destroyed. It is now located in the municipality of Morlanwelz in the Province of Hainaut, Belgium. It is part of the Domaine de Mariemont which encompasses the park, a wooded drève, orchards adjoining on both sides of this one and the forest of Mariemont. Designed by Charles-Henri Petersen in 1832 and kept by his pupils Édouard Keilig and Louis Fuchs until the end of that century, it is an English-style landscaped park, designed as a leisure and collection park. It houses a collection of trees and plants from around the world collection of magnolias and rhododendrons, Lebanon cedar, ginkgo, purple sycamore, Giant Redwoods. In total, more than 2,000 species and varieties that are represented in the lawns, ponds, woodlands or along the roads. Statues from around the world are also located throughout the park along with the Musée Royal de Mariemont. Chestnut trees adorn the park which bear abundant fruit which visitors can gather and enjoy.

The estate's last private owner, Raoul Warocqué (1870-1917), bequeathed it to the Belgian state. Today it is a public park and the Musée royal de Mariemont. It contains one of the original casts of Auguste Rodin's sculpture The Burghers of Calais.

See also
List of castles in Belgium
Charles-Henri Petersen
Les Orangeries de Bierbais

References

External links
Musée royal de Mariemont website

Geography of Hainaut (province)
Parks in Belgium
Tourist attractions in Hainaut (province)
Protected heritage sites in Hainaut (province)